The Women's 200 metre butterfly competition of the 2014 European Aquatics Championships was held on 23–24 August.

Records
Prior to the competition, the existing world, European and championship records were as follows.

Results

Heats
The heats were held at 09:51.

Semifinals
The semifinals were held at 17:13.

Semifinal 1

Semifinal 2

Final
The final was held at 16:20.

References

Women's 200 metre butterfly